Ross Hay is a New Zealand rugby union player currently playing for the Heartland Championship team North Otago.

References 

1980 births
Living people
New Zealand rugby union players
North Otago rugby union players
Rugby union players from Oamaru
Rugby union flankers